Keith Thom is a Guyanese lawyer who has been a judge in Antigua and Barbuda and on the Eastern Caribbean Supreme Court.

Thom earned a bachelor of law degree at the University of the West Indies in Barbados. He worked in a private legal practice in Georgetown, Guyana for two years and in 1993 emigrated to Antigua and Barbuda to become the Director of Public Prosecutions. He held this position until being appointed a magistrate for Antigua and Barbuda in 2003.

In 2012, the Judicial and Legal Services Commission of the Caribbean Community appointed Thom as an Acting High Court Judge on the Eastern Caribbean Supreme Court; he was assigned to live in and hear cases from Antigua and Barbuda. Thom's wife Gertel Thom has been a High Court Judge on the same court since 2005, having been appointed to reside in and hear cases from Saint Vincent and the Grenadines.

References
Eastern Caribbean Supreme Court: Antigua and Barbuda
"New High Court Judge Appointed", Antigua Observer, 2012-05-14
Oscar Ramjeet, "Guyanese husband and wife are judges in the Caribbean", Kaieteur News, 2012-07-26

Living people
Eastern Caribbean Supreme Court justices
20th-century Guyanese lawyers
21st-century Guyanese judges
Guyanese judges on the courts of Antigua and Barbuda
Guyanese emigrants to Antigua and Barbuda
Prosecutors
University of the West Indies alumni
Guyanese judges of international courts and tribunals
Antigua and Barbuda judges of international courts and tribunals
Year of birth missing (living people)